Fredrik Bryngelsson (born 10 April 1975) is a Swedish retired footballer who now works as co-owner of the Business & Sports Club in his home country.

Career
Bryngelsson started his senior career with Norrby IF. In 2000, he signed for Stockport County in the English Football League First Division, where he made ten appearances and scored zero goals. After that, he played for English club Shrewsbury Town, Norwegian club Raufoss IL,

References

External links 
 Padel en sport för alla
 Bryngelsson tillbaka till Sverige? 
 Swedish ace set to leave
 Exit Raufoss 
 Forfalsket dommer-signatur
 Nu har våran kapten bestämt sig!
 altomfotball.no Profile 
 svenskfotboll.se Profile 
 Elite Football Profile 
 Go Go Go County Profile

1975 births
Living people
Swedish footballers
Swedish expatriate footballers
Association football defenders
Expatriate footballers in Norway
Raufoss IL players
Stockport County F.C. players
Rochdale A.F.C. players
Norrby IF players
BK Häcken players
Shrewsbury Town F.C. players
IF Elfsborg players
Expatriate footballers in England
Swedish expatriate sportspeople in Norway
Swedish expatriate sportspeople in England